James Ledger (born 1966) is an Australian composer of contemporary classical music, and senior lecturer in composition at the Conservatorium of Music at the University of Western Australia, where he is chair of orchestral composition.

Biography

Ledger first rose to prominence with his first orchestral composition Indian Pacific in 1996, which is still regularly performed in Australia. Ledger is also known for his compositions Devils in the Underground for solo trumpet, the violin concerto Golden Years, Chronicles for orchestra, War Music for choir and orchestra, and the song cycle Conversations with Ghosts in collaboration with the musician Paul Kelly, for which he won an ARIA award.

From 2007 to 2009 he was the composer-in-residence for the West Australian Symphony Orchestra. In 2011 he was named composer-in-residence for the Australian National Academy of Music.

In 2019 Ledger won the ARIA Award for Best Classical Album for Thirteen Ways to Look at Birds, another collaboration with Paul Kelly.

In 2020, he earned a Doctorate of Music from the University of Western Australia. His Viola Concerto, premiered by Brett Dean and the West Australian Symphony Orchestra, won the APRA AMCOS Art Music award in the "Work of the Year – Large Ensemble" category.

Awards and nominations

ARIA Music Awards
The ARIA Music Awards is an annual awards ceremony that recognises excellence, innovation, and achievement across all genres of Australian music.

! 
|-
|2013
|Conversations with Ghosts (with Paul Kelly, Genevieve Lacey & ANAM Musicians)
|Best Original Soundtrack/Cast/ Show Album
| 
|
|-
|2019
|Thirteen Ways to Look at Birds (with Paul Kelly)
|Best Classical Album
| 
|
|-
|}

APRA AMCOS Awards and nominations
 2006 Best Performance of an Australian Composition (Nominee) – WASO performing James Ledger, Line Drawing
 2008 Orchestral Work of the Year (Nominee), James Ledger, Trumpet Concerto
 2011 Work of the Year – Instrumental (Winner), James Ledger, Chronicles
 2012 Performance of the Year (Winner), James Ledger, Two Memorials performed by WASO
 2014, Work of the Year, Orchestral (Nominee), James Ledger, Golden Years
 2020, Work of the Year, Large Ensemble (Winner), James Ledger, Viola Concerto

Works

Orchestra
 Indian Pacific (1996)
 Peeling (2004) for strings and percussion
 Habits of Creaters (2004)
 Horn Concerto (2005)
 Line Drawing (2005) for recorder and strings
 Trumpet Concerto (2007)
 The Madness and Death of King Ludwig (2007) for large ensemble of brass, percussion, and double basses
 Arcs and Planes (2009)
 Chronicles (2009)
 Neon (2010) version for orchestra and chamber ensemble
 Outposts (2011) bassoon concerto (for Matthew Wilkie)
 Two Memorials (for Anton Webern and John Lennon) (2011)
 Golden Years (2013) concerto for violin and orchestra
 News, Weather and Dreams (2014)
 War Music (2015)
 Simpler Times (2015)
The Natural Church (2016) for chamber orchestra
Hollow Kings (2016)
The Natural Order of Things (2017) for strings
 Viola Concerto (2019) concerto for viola and orchestra

Chamber ensemble
 Abandoned Drive-in (2002) for mixed ensemble
 Mean Ol' World (2004) for mixed ensemble
 Two Fanfares (2005) for brass ensemble
 Inscriptions (2006) for piano trio
 Bell Weather (2008) for mixed ensemble
 Rashomon Confessions (2009) for clarinet and string quartet
 Processions (2011) for string quartet
 In Orbit (2011) for mixed ensemble
 Silver Swans (2012) for mixed ensemble
 Igor's Drum (2013) for mixed ensemble
 When Chaplin Met Einstein (2014) for mixed ensemble
 House of Stairs (2014) for piano quartetThe Distortion Mirror (2018) for string quartet and live electronics

Solo
 Devils on the Underground (2010) for trumpet and live electronics
 '"Quickening (2010) for vibraphone and live electronics
 All Hail the Machine (2011) for bass clarinet and live electronics
 See How They Run (2012) for violin and portable audio player
 Blood Water Wine (2013) for cello
Chant (2017) for double bass
Intended Inventions (2018) for piano

References

External links
 

Living people
1966 births
ARIA Award winners
APRA Award winners
Musicians from Perth, Western Australia
Australian male classical composers
21st-century classical composers
Place of birth missing (living people)
Academic staff of the University of Western Australia
21st-century Australian male musicians
21st-century Australian musicians